"Let Him Go" is a 1985 song by American synthpop band Animotion from their self-titled debut album. The song was their second single to reach the top 40 in the United States on the Billboard Hot 100, the first being "Obsession". The song also reached number 41 in Germany and number 78 in the United Kingdom. The song, in both 7" and 12" edits, appeared on the band's greatest hits album 20th Century Masters: The Best of Animotion.

Charts

References

1985 singles
1985 songs
Animotion songs
Mercury Records singles